The 2009 LifeLock.com 400 was the nineteenth race of the 2009 NASCAR Sprint Cup schedule, marking the start of the second half of the season.

Summary 

This 267 lap  event was held on Saturday night, July 11 at the  Chicagoland Speedway. This would be the last TV broadcast of the year for the TNT Summer Series, with radio being handled by Sirius XM Radio (satellite) and MRN (over-the-air) starting at 7 PM US EDT. The green flag waved shortly after 8:17 or 8:19 PM US EDT.

Pre-race news 
Michael Waltrip Racing held a press conference on Tuesday July 7, with the announcements being that driver/owner Michael Waltrip will run a limited schedule in 2010, with one of those races being the 52nd Daytona 500, and replacing him as the third full-time driver will be Martin Truex Jr., who will leave Earnhardt Ganassi Racing at the end of the 2009 season, stepping down from the #1 Chevrolet Impala SS to drive the #56 Toyota Camry.

Qualifying 
Brian Vickers won his 5th pole of the season with rookie Scott Speed taking 2nd position, marking the first time both Red Bull teammates started a NASCAR race on the front row.

Race recap 
Mark Martin dominated the race, leading 4 times for 195 laps, but would be passed by Jimmie Johnson on the third to last restart. The race would then have some wild final laps, as Martin went to the lead with 15 laps left after a pass on Brian Vickers when he and Denny Hamlin touched. Jeff Gordon was the highest car with fresh tires, making up six spots in only two laps, but would finish 2nd as Mark Martin pulled away from the rest of the field restarting on the outside lane and would go on to win his 4th race of the season. By finishing 1st and 2nd in both races sponsored by LifeLock this season, Mark Martin and Jeff Gordon win the Musgrave family (no relation to Ted Musgrave) $1,000,000.

Results

References 

LifeLock.com 400
LifeLock.com 400
NASCAR races at Chicagoland Speedway
July 2009 sports events in the United States